Aue-Fallstein was a short-lived municipality in the district of Harz, in Saxony-Anhalt, Germany. It was formed on 11 September 2003 by the merger of the former municipalities Dardesheim, Deersheim, Hessen, Osterode am Fallstein, Rohrsheim, Veltheim and Zilly. On 1 January 2010, it was merged into the town Osterwieck.

References

Former municipalities in Saxony-Anhalt
Osterwieck